Eugene Pechet (September 22, 1916 – August 23, 2008) was a Canadian hotelier and banker. He bought his first hotel in 1942 and went on to build and operate 22 hotels throughout Western Canada and the United States.

Banking industry involvement
With Charles Allard, Pechet also founded the Canadian Western Bank, formerly the Bank of Alberta. They started the bank with three employees working out of an office located in one of Mr. Pechet’s hotels. As of 2010, the CWB has total balance sheet assets of just under $12 billion, assets under administration of over $8 billion and assets under management approaching $1 billion.

Awards and achievements
 In 1997, Pechet won the Pinnacle lifetime achievement award.

References

External links
 Stagewest Hospitality Corporate Website, 2017 website via Wayback Machine
 Canadian Western Bank Group Corporate Website 

1916 births
2008 deaths
Businesspeople from Edmonton
Canadian hoteliers
Canadian bankers
Romanian emigrants to Canada